Between Anglo-Saxon times and the nineteenth century Huntingdonshire was divided for administrative purposes into 4 hundreds, plus the borough of Huntingdon. Each hundred had a separate council that met each month to rule on local judicial and taxation matters.

Huntingdonshire was divided into four roughly equally sized hundreds: Norman Cross, Leightonstone, Hurstingstone, and Toseland, which respectively fill the northern, western, eastern and southern quarters of the county.

The hundreds were probably of very early origin, and that of Norman Cross is referred to in 963. The Domesday Survey, besides the four existing divisions of Norman Cross, Toseland, Hurstingstone and Leightonstone, which from their assessment appear to have been double hundreds, mentions an additional hundred of Kimbolton, since absorbed in Leightonstone, while Huntingdon was assessed separately at 50 hides. The boundaries of the county have scarcely changed since the time of the Domesday Survey, except that parts of the Bedfordshire parishes of Everton, Pertenhall and Keysoe and the Northamptonshire parish of Hargrave were then assessed under Huntingdonshire.

Parishes

At the start of the 19th century, the hundreds contained the following parishes:

In addition, three detached parishes formed part of Huntingdonshire until they were incorporated into Bedfordshire in the late 19th century, and each was historically part of one of the Hundreds of Bedfordshire. Eaton Socon fell into Barford hundred, Everton in Biggleswade hundred, and Tilbrook in Stodden hundred.

See also
History of Huntingdonshire
List of hundreds of England and Wales

References

External links
Cambridge Military History Blog: A dialogue focused on the history of Huntingdonshire and Cambridgeshire from a military perspective

 
Huntingdonshire